Calochortus barbatus is a species of mariposa lilies in the lily family. It is endemic to Mexico.

Distribution
The bulb is widespread across much of montane Mexico, from Chihuahua in the northeast to Oaxaca in the southeast.

It is found in grasslands, and open oak and pine woods below  in elevation.

Description
Calochortus barbatus is a bulb-forming perennial with branching stems up to 50 cm tall.

Flowers are nodding (hanging), and are yellow with yellow or purple hairs. The flowers are hermaphrodite, and are pollinated by insects.

See also
Sierra Madre de Oaxaca pine-oak forests

References

External links 
 
Conabio.gob.mx: Photos of Calochortus barbatus 
Pacific Bulb Society: Calochortus Species One — color photos of several species including Calochortus barbatus.

barbatus
Endemic flora of Mexico
Flora of Central Mexico
Flora of Northeastern Mexico
Flora of Southeastern Mexico
Plants described in 1816